Rowing events were held from 30 September 2022 to 2 October 2022 at Sabarmati Riverfront Venue 1, Ahmedabad.

Medal table

References

2022 National Games of India
Rowing in India
National Games of India